Jeppe Kjær Jensen (born 1 March 2004) is a Danish professional footballer who plays for Norwegian club Bodø/Glimt.

Club career

AC Horsens
Kjær joined AC Horsens from local club Hatting/Torsted IF at the age of 12. In the autumn of 2018, Kjær went on two trials at the English club Southampton accompanied by his father, and the talent manager of Horsens, Claus Troelsen. On his 15th birthday, 1 March 2019, Kjær signed a three-year deal with Horsens. On 28 August 2019, the club confirmed that Kjær was going on a trial at Juventus and was going to play in a friendly tournament for the club. In November 2019, Horsens' manager, Bo Henriksen, confirmed that both Juventus and Southampton were ready to sign him, but Horsens eventually refused to let him go.

On Kjær's 16th birthday, 1 March 2020, he made his professional debut for AC Horsens and became the youngest ever to make his debut in the Danish Superliga. Kjær started on the bench, before he replaced Michael Lumb in the 79th minute in a 1–2 defeat against Randers FC.

Ajax
On 14 August 2020, Dutch club Ajax announced that Kjær would join the club as of 7 September. He signed a three-year contract and was initially included in the youth academy.

After two years in the academy, Kjær got his official debut for Jong Ajax on 12 September 2022 against NAC Breda.

Bodø/Glimt
On 17 January 2023, it was confirmed that Kjær had joined Norwegian Eliteserien club Bodø/Glimt on a permanent deal, signing a contract until June 2027.

References

External links
 
 Jeppe Kjær at DBU 

2004 births
Living people
Danish men's footballers
Danish expatriate men's footballers
Association football midfielders
Denmark youth international footballers
Sportspeople from the Central Denmark Region
People from Horsens
Hatting/Torsted IF players
AC Horsens players
Jong Ajax players
FK Bodø/Glimt players
Danish Superliga players
Danish 1st Division players
Eerste Divisie players
Danish expatriate sportspeople in the Netherlands
Danish expatriate sportspeople in Norway
Expatriate footballers in the Netherlands
Expatriate footballers in Norway